Poughkeepsie is a city in Dutchess County, New York, United States. 

Poughkeepsie can also refer to:
Relating to Poughkeepsie, New York:
Poughkeepsie (Metro-North station), a railroad station in the city
Poughkeepsie (town), New York, a town surrounding the city
The Poughkeepsie Tapes, a 2007 film based in and named after the aforementioned city.
Poughkeepsie, Arkansas, an unincorporated area in Sharp County, Arkansas